Abastumani is a small town (daba) and climatic spa in Adigeni Municipality, Samtskhe-Javakheti, Georgia. It is located on the southern slopes of the Meskheti Range (Lesser Caucasus), in the small river valley of Otskhe, 25 km northeast of Adigeni and 28 km west of Akhaltsikhe. As of the 2014 census, it had a population of 937. The Georgian National Astrophysical Observatory is located at Abastumani.

History 
In medieval Georgia, the area of modern-day Abastumani was part of the district of Odzrkhe so named after a fortress whose ruins survive near the townlet. In the 16th century, it fell to the Ottoman Empire under whose rule the area was deserted, but its hot springs were appreciated and frequented by locals. Under the Russian rule, a short-lived German colony of Friedenthal emerged there in 1842. In the 1850s, it was recolonized by the Russians under the patronage of Viceroy of the Caucasus Mikhail Vorontsov. The new settlement acquired the name Abbas-Tuman after a nearby located village and became popular for its climate and thermal waters. Its development as a resort is chiefly associated with Grand Duke George Alexandrovich (1871–1899), a member of the Russian imperial family, who had retired there due to his ill-health. Abastumani acquired the status of an urban-type settlement (Georgian: daba) under the Soviet Union in 1926. Tourism infrastructure has been renovated since the mid-2000s.

Spa 
Abastumani possesses a moderately dry mountainous climate, with relative humidity reaching 50% only in summer. The annual average number of hours of sunlight is 3,000. Average annual precipitation is 626 mm. Abastumani's three hyperthermic springs (39–48.5 °C) are little mineralized, rich in sulfate-sodium chloride waters. They have long been used in the treatment of tuberculosis. Abastumani is also a starting point for hikes into the Borjomi-Kharagauli National Park.

Landmarks 
Beyond being a spa town with functioning hotels and sanatoria, Abastumani houses several cultural landmarks documenting the townlet's medieval and modern history. These are:
The 14th-century church of St. George, which was repaired and its hitherto unknown medieval frescos discovered in 2008.
The 13th-century ruined castle and a single arch bridge named after the medieval Queen Thamar.
The "New Zarzma" (Akhali Zarzma) church of St. Alexander Nevsky, a 19th-century small replica of the 14th-century Georgian cathedral of Zarzma. It was commissioned by Grand Duke George from the Tbilisi-based architect Otto Jacob Simons who built it between 1899 and 1902, marrying a medieval Georgian design with the contemporaneous architectural forms. Its interior was frescoed by the Russian painter Mikhail Nesterov.
A bathhouse constructed on the Abastumani hot springs between 1879 and 1881 by the St. Petersburg-born physician of German descent Adolf Remmert (Адольф Александрович Реммерт; 1835–1902). Remmert died in Germany and, according to his will, was buried at a Catholic church in Abastumani, which has not survived.
Winter and summer mansions of Grand Duke George designed by Otto Jacob Simons and built of stone and wood, respectively. Located on the opposite banks of the Otskhe, they were connected through a small bridge. The summer mansion was frequented by the party officials in the Soviet era. In the 1990s, it was turned over to the Georgian Orthodox Church and converted into a St. Panteleimon nunnery. The building was destroyed in a fire on March 12, 2008, and is currently being rebuilt.

See also 
 Georgian National Astrophysical Observatory
 Samtskhe-Javakheti

References 

Cities and towns in Samtskhe–Javakheti
Spa towns in Georgia (country)
Populated places in Adigeni Municipality